Kim Il-ung is a former Leader of the 2nd Emergency Response Commission of the Labor Party in South Korea.

References

External links 
 Kim Il-ung's website 
  
  

1976 births
Living people
People from Gyeonggi Province
New Progressive Party (South Korea) politicians
Labor Party (South Korea) politicians